The Podhajcer Shul was a synagogue on 108 East First Street, just north of Houston Street, in the Lower East Side neighborhood of Manhattan, New York City.  Although the building has been repurposed to residential use, its facade retains a prominent Star of David, as well as a stone arch inscribed "Beth HaKnesset Ansche Podhajce," which means "Synagogue of the People of Podhajce," and two capitals in the shape of Torah scrolls.

History
Congregation Masas Benjamin Podhajce was founded in 1895 by Austrian Jews from Podhajce, Galicia. In 1926, they purchased the building on 1st Street and consecrated it as their new synagogue. During the 1920s, another congregation, Rodeph Shalom Independent Pohajce, shared the building with Masas Benjamin Podhajce. Neither of these congregations exist anymore. In the 1980s, a group of Lithuanian Jews named Kochob Jacob Anshe Kamenitz used the synagogue. This congregation was organized in 1892 and had previously met at 248 Division Street, 385 Grand Street and 54-6 Pitt Street. The building was empty from 1985 to 1990, when it was taken over by Congregation Beth Yitzchoch. In 1995, the building was rented as a space for visual and performing arts. The building was later repurposed to residential use.

References

External links
 History of Congregation Masas Benjamin Anshe Podhajce
 Synagogue Space
 Podhajce History and Historical Documents

Lower East Side
Orthodox synagogues in New York City
Synagogues in Manhattan